Thermocrinis ruber is a species of bacteria. It is a pink-filament-forming hyperthermophilic bacterium first isolated from Yellowstone National Park. Its cells are gram-negative and grow at temperatures up to 89 °C. Its type strain is OC 1/4 [= DSM 12173].

References

Further reading
Ármannsson, Halldór. Geochemistry of the Earth's Surface : Proceedings of the 5th International Symposium On the Geochemistry of the Earth Surface, Reykjavik, Iceland, 16–20 August 1999. Rotterdam: A.A. Balkema, 1999.
Dworkin, Martin, and Stanley Falkow, eds. The Prokaryotes: Vol. 7: Proteobacteria: Delta and Epsilon Subclasses. Deeply Rooting Bacteria. Vol. 7. Springer, 2006.

External links 
LPSN

Type strain of Thermocrinis ruber at BacDive -  the Bacterial Diversity Metadatabase

Aquificota
Bacteria described in 1999